Alejandro Madorno (born 12 December 1971) is an Argentine equestrian. He competed in the individual jumping event at the 2012 Summer Olympics.

References

External links
 
 
 
 

1971 births
Living people
Argentine male equestrians
Olympic equestrians of Argentina
Equestrians at the 2012 Summer Olympics
Sportspeople from Buenos Aires